Home from Babylon is a 1941 Swedish drama film directed by Alf Sjöberg and starring Gerd Hagman, Arnold Sjöstrand and Georg Rydeberg. It was based on a 1923 novel of the same title by Sigfrid Siwertz. It was shot at the Centrumateljéerna Studios in Stockholm and on location around the city. The film's sets were designed by the art director Bertil Duroj.

Cast
 Gerd Hagman as Britta von Wendt
 Arnold Sjöstrand as Linus Treffenberg
 Georg Rydeberg as Cesar Lee
 Anders Henrikson as Sergej Nabocof
 Irma Christenson as Marcelle
 Olof Widgren as John Bidencap 
 Rune Carlsten as Wigelius
 Georg Funkquist as Hugo
 Barbro Kollberg as Gunborg
 Frank Sundström as Marabou

References

Bibliography
 Goble, Alan. The Complete Index to Literary Sources in Film. Walter de Gruyter, 1999.
 Gustafsson, Fredrik. The Man from the Third Row: Hasse Ekman, Swedish Cinema and the Long Shadow of Ingmar Bergman. Berghahn Books, 2016.
 Qvist, Per Olov & von Bagh, Peter. Guide to the Cinema of Sweden and Finland. Greenwood Publishing Group, 2000.

External links
 

1941 films
1941 drama films
1940s Swedish-language films
Swedish black-and-white films
Films directed by Alf Sjöberg
Swedish drama films
Films based on Swedish novels
1940s Swedish films